The 1983 OFC U-17 Championship, was the OFC Under 17 Qualifying Tournament, the biennial football championship of Oceania (OFC). It was the 1st edition of the tournament and was held in Auckland, New Zealand from 3 to 10 December 1983. New Zealand qualified for the 1985 FIFA U-16 World Championship, in China.

Teams
1. 
2. 
3. 
4. 
5. 
6.

Group stage

 qualified for 1985 FIFA U-16 World Championship.

Matches
(order of matches unknown)

 2–1  3–0  4–0  4–1  9–0  1–0  1–0  0–0  4–0  3–0  8–0  0–0  4–3  2–1  2–2 

OFC U-17 Championship
1983 in youth association football